Kork (also Romanized as Kark; also known as Kork-e ‘Olyā and Kurk) is a village in Kork and Nartich Rural District, in the Central District of Bam County, Kerman Province, Iran. At the 2006 census, its population was 565, in 177 families.

References 

Populated places in Bam County